Roseland Cottage, also known as Henry C. Bowen House or as Bowen Cottage, is a historic house located on Route 169 in Woodstock, Connecticut, United States. The house was added to the National Register of Historic Places in 1977, and was declared a National Historic Landmark in 1992.  It is described as one of the best-preserved and best-documented Gothic summer houses in the nation, with virtually intact interior decorations.

It is now owned by Historic New England, a non-profit organization that preserves the historical value of the house and operates it as a museum.

History
Roseland Cottage was built in 1846 in the Gothic Revival style as the summer home of Henry Chandler Bowen and family. The entire complex, with a boxwood parterre garden, an icehouse, garden house, carriage barn, and the nation's oldest surviving indoor bowling alley, reflects the principles of writer and designer Andrew Jackson Downing. In his widely popular books, Downing stressed practicality along with the picturesque, and offered detailed instructions on room function, sanitation, and landscaping.

Beginning in 1870, the largest Fourth of July celebrations in the United States were held at Roseland Cottage. Four United States Presidents visited Bowen's summer home as his guests and speakers for these celebrations: Ulysses S. Grant, Benjamin Harrison, Rutherford B. Hayes, and William McKinley. Other prominent visitors included Henry Ward Beecher, Julia Ward Howe, Oliver Wendell Holmes and John C. Fremont. The home and gardens on one of these occasions were described in a local newspaper in 1887:

Today the house remains in excellent historic condition, with original Gothic furniture and embossed Lincrusta Walton wall decoration. The house, known locally as The Pink House, is currently painted coral pink, and located on Woodstock Hill Common. Roseland's parterre garden contain twenty-one flowerbeds with more than 4,000 annuals bordered in boxwood, in their original 1850 pattern, and now form part of Connecticut's Historic Gardens.

The house is a contributing property within NRHP-listed Woodstock Hill Historic District.

Gallery

See also
List of National Historic Landmarks in Connecticut
National Register of Historic Places listings in Windham County, Connecticut

References

External links 

 Historic New England website
 Historic American Buildings Survey (Library of Congress) - Bowen Cottage

Woodstock, Connecticut
Historic house museums in Connecticut
Museums in Windham County, Connecticut
National Historic Landmarks in Connecticut
Carpenter Gothic houses in the United States
Houses completed in 1846
Houses on the National Register of Historic Places in Connecticut
Houses in Windham County, Connecticut
National Register of Historic Places in Windham County, Connecticut
Historic New England
Historic district contributing properties in Connecticut